Terry Stacey (born 24 July 1962) is a British cinematographer. He graduated from the University of Manchester, England. He moved to New York in the early 1980s and worked as a still photographer and musician working at The Collective for the Living Cinema. He made and edited Super 8mm shorts, and experimenting in the music video arena.

He began by making documentaries while travelling through South America with his 16 mm bolex. He continued making documentaries in England, India, and Iceland. Stacey has written and directed many of his own short films.

Filmography

Awards
In 1999 he won special mention for The Dream Catcher at the Thessaloniki Film Festival.
In 1995 Bad Liver and Broken Heart starring Sam Rockwell was screened at the Berlin International Film Festival.

External links

 http://terrystacey.com/bio.html

English film directors
English screenwriters
English male screenwriters
Living people
Alumni of the University of Manchester
English cinematographers
1962 births